Code Purple can mean:

 the US Environmental Protection Agency code for an air quality index between 201 and 300
a hospital emergency code
The US codename for the Japanese Type B Cipher Machine